Timothy Raymond Higgins (born February 7, 1958) is a Canadian retired former professional ice hockey player who played 706 career NHL games with the Chicago Black Hawks, New Jersey Devils and Detroit Red Wings. He played junior hockey with his hometown Ottawa 67's and was drafted in the first round of the 1978 NHL Amateur Draft, 10th overall by the Black Hawks.

Career statistics

External links
 

1958 births
Living people
Adirondack Red Wings players
Canadian ice hockey right wingers
Chicago Blackhawks draft picks
Chicago Blackhawks players
Chicago Blackhawks scouts
Detroit Red Wings players
Ice hockey people from Ottawa
National Hockey League first-round draft picks
New Brunswick Hawks players
New Jersey Devils players
Ottawa 67's players
Ottawa Senators scouts